Natrium is an unincorporated community in Marshall County, West Virginia, United States.

Natrium is home to the PPG Natrium Wildlife Management Area, a protected area along the Ohio River maintained by PPG Industries.

References 

Unincorporated communities in West Virginia
Unincorporated communities in Marshall County, West Virginia